Peter Mayen Majongdit also known as Peter Mayen is a South Sudanese politician and the former minister of Humanitarian Affairs and Disaster Management between March 2020 and November 2022. South Sudan president Salva Kiir Mayardit fired him on 16 November 2022 amid rising hunger across the country's flood and conflict-affected areas.

Controversy  
In 2021 Peter, Mayen was accused by the members of public and the civil society activists for allegedly beating and stabbing his wife. This caused removal of his membership of the OPP (Other Political Parties).

A petition was launched by civil rights activists to have him removed from his ministerial position which was not endorsed by the president so he keeps his position as of 2022.

References 

Living people

Year of birth missing (living people)
South Sudanese politicians